John Peter Allix (2 December 1785 – 19 February 1848) was a British Conservative politician.

Allix was elected Conservative Member of Parliament for Cambridgeshire at the 1841 general election and held the seat until 1847 when he did not seek re-election.

References

External links
 

1785 births
1848 deaths
UK MPs 1841–1847
Conservative Party (UK) MPs for English constituencies